The International Federation of Blood Donor Organizations (abbreviated IFBDO in English, and FIODS in French and Spanish) is the international organization representing the voluntary, anonymous and non-remunerated blood donors.

The main stated aim of IFBDO is reaching self-sufficiency of the member states in blood and blood components from voluntary, anonymous and non-remunerated blood donors, as well as harmonization of the security standards for blood donation and inspection processes.

IFBDO has the Participatory status with the Council of Europe, and it is Registered at United Nations Department of Economic and Social Affairs (NGO Branch). IFBDO is a signee of Melbourne Declaration (2009) and Dublin Consensus (2010).

History

The IFBDO was founded in Luxembourg on December 4, 1955.  The Headquarters are established in Monaco.

World Blood Donor Day 
Since 1995 IFBDO had been organizing International Blood Donor Day as a particular initiative, but in 2002 IFBDO started negotiations with the three most important international organizations who promote blood donation: World Health Organization (WHO), the International Federation of Red Cross and Red Crescent Societies (IFRCS) and the International Society of Blood Transfusion (ISBT), as a result of which in 2004 all four organizations signed an agreement establishing the World Blood Donor Day.

At the World Health Assembly in 2005, the ministers of health of all WHO member states unanimously adopted a resolution that recognized voluntary non-remunerated blood donors as the cornerstone of a safe, adequate and sustainable blood supply. Since then World Blood Donor Day is celebrated on June 14 every year and it is sponsored by the founding partners IFBDO, WHO, IFRCS and ISBT.

International Youth Committee
In 2000, IFBDO established the International Youth Committee (IYC) to promote youth volunteering for blood donation and increase youth participation in Federation activities.

At least once a year, the IYC organizes the IFBDO/FIODS International Youth Forum, an international event for all young blood donors and young volunteer associates aged between 18 and 30 years. The event is hosted on a rotation basis in one of the countries affiliated to the Federation and has an average duration of 3–4 days.

The International Youth Committee's policy is directed by the IYC Board, which is elected every three years to coincide with the Forum. The representative figures of the IYC Board are: President (currently Narmin Rahimova, Azerbaijan), Secretary-General (currently Simon Baraldi, Italy) and Treasurer (currently Aryan Uprety, Nepal). The IYC Board is also composed of the Continental Delegates: Africa (currently Dounia Belouafi, Morocco), Asia (currently Tatiana Esta, Lebanon), Europe (currently Francesca Gorga, Italy).

** Membership approved, pending ratification by General Assembly.

References

International medical and health organizations
Blood donation
International organisations based in Monaco
Organizations established in 1955
1955 establishments in Luxembourg